quh may be:
 the ISO language code for South Bolivian Quechua
 a trigraph formerly used in Scots spelling in place of wh